Shatalovka is a rural locality (a selo) in Starooskolsky District, Belgorod Oblast, Russia. The population was 1,452 as of 2010. There are 32 streets.

Geography 
Shatalovka is located 46 km southeast of Stary Oskol (the district's administrative centre) by road. Grinyovka is the nearest rural locality.

References 

Rural localities in Starooskolsky District
Nizhnedevitsky Uyezd